The Ecomuseo delle ferriere e fonderie di Calabria (Ecomuseum of the iron-works and iron-foundries of Calabria) is an ecomuseum in Bivongi, Calabria, southern Italy.

The project was founded in 1982 by the Associazione Calabrese Archeologia Industriale (Calabrian Association for Industrial Archaeology). Its purposes are research, study, preservation and cultural promotion of the Calabrian industrial heritage, and, in particular, what remains of it in the Vallata dello Stilaro and Serre Calabresi.

Itineraries
The museum incorporates four itineraries focussing on:
 Waters and metallurgy
 Mines
 Mills
 Religion

Gallery

See also

Serre Calabresi
Ecomuseum
Industrial archeology
Reali ferriere ed Officine di Mongiana

Sources

External links
Official website

Museums in Calabria
Ecomuseums
Open-air museums in Italy
Vallata dello Stilaro
Mining museums
Industry museums in Italy